The Messerschmitt Bf 163 was an STOL aircraft designed by BFW and built by Weser Flugzeugbau before World War II.

Design and development 

During the autumn of 1935, the considerable potential of the Fieseler Fi 156 project for the tasks of short-range reconnaissance and aerial observation had prompted the RLM to draw up a requirement for an army cooperation and observation aircraft with its performance parameters. The requirement stipulated the use of the Argus As 10 or the Hirth HM 508 engine and placed emphasis on short field performance, maximum possible allround view for the two crew members, and a wide range of speed. It was intended that the resultant aircraft, which the Siebel Si 201 was also designed to compete for, would be evaluated in competition with the Fi 156.

The Bf 163 closely followed the formula established by the Fi 156 by being a high-wing braced monoplane with a metal structure, automatic leading edge wing slots, double slotted flaps, and an exceptionally tall undercarriage. The aircraft's most interesting feature was the provision for varying the incidence of the entire wing which swivelled on its mainspar, the bracing struts being attached to the fuselage by ball joints and changing their angle with movement of the wing. Construction of the sole prototype was entrusted to Weserflug, though due to its origin with the Bayerische Flugzeugwerke before mid-July 1938, it retained the Bf RLM prefix for the earlier firm.

Operational history 
First flown on 19 February 1938 and powered by the Argus As 10C, the Bf 163 V1 proved to have similar performance characteristics to those of the Fi 156 but was more complex and expensive. Although some components for a second prototype were manufactured, the Bf 163 V2 was not completed and further work on the Bf 163 was terminated in favor of the Fieseler Fi 156.

Designation 

In a very rare decision, the RLM reissued the airframe designation number 8-163 for the Me 163 Komet rocket-propelled interceptor, after having used the number for the Bf 163. The two aircraft are distinguished by the abbreviation: the earlier Bf 163, and the later Me 163. The new "Me" prefix was adopted for all new designs of Messerschmitt aircraft, after the company's official name of Bayerische Flugzeugwerke (BFW) was changed to Messerschmitt AG, from Willy Messerschmitt's full acquisition of the Bayerische Flugzeugwerke firm on July 11, 1938.

Specifications (Bf 163 V1)

See also

Sources 

 Green, William Warplanes of the Third Reich. Galahad Books, 1986.  .

Bf 163
1930s German military reconnaissance aircraft
Single-engined tractor aircraft
Parasol-wing aircraft
Aircraft first flown in 1938